List of all known attributed compositions by Sylvius Leopold Weiss (1686–1750), German composer and lutenist.

Description of columns
 Name: Name of the piece
 Key: Key of the piece
 WeissSW: Weiss Sämtliche Werke number
 Sm: Smith number
 Klima: Klima number
 A-ETgoëssV: Folio number in A-ETgoëss Ms. V	Bibliothek von Graf Goëss, Schloss Ebenthal, Kärnten 
 A-ETgoëssX: Folio number in A-ETGoëss Ms. X	Goëss Hueber (1740), Bibliothek von Graf Goëss, Schloss Ebenthal, Kärnten
 A-GÖI: Folio number in A-GÖ Ms. Lautentabulatur Nr. 1(D.A.Smith = N°. 2), Kloster Göttweig
 A-KR156: A-KR Ms. L156	"Eggerspergerische Lautenstuckh", Abtei Kremsmünster
 A-KR77: Folio number in A-KR Ms. L77	Benediktinerstift Kremsmünster
 A-KR78: Folio number in A-KR Ms. L78	Benediktinerstift Kremsmünster
 A-ROI: Folio number in A-RO Ms. 1	"Weiss Sylvio – Lautenmusik", Schloß Rohrau
 A-ROII: Folio number in A-RO Ms. 2	"Lauten Musik von unbekannten Componisten", Schloß Rohrau 
 A-SEI: Folio number in A-SEI	Stiftsbibliothek von Seitenstetten
 A-Su: Folio number in A-Su M III 25	Salzburg Ms., Studienbibliothek von Salzburg 
 A-Wn1078: Folio number in A-Wn Ms. Suppl. Mus. 1078	Österreichische Nationalbibliothek von Wien
 A-Wn18761: Folio number in A-Wn Ms. Mus. 18761	Österreichische Nationalbibliothek von Wien                   
 A-Wn18829: F olio number in A-Wn Ms. Mus. 18829	Österreichische Nationalbibliothek von Wien
 B-Bc15: Folio number in B-Bc Litt. S. N°.15.132 	Conservatoire Royal de Bruxelles
 B-Bc27: Folio number in B-Bc Litt. S. N°.27.885 	Conservatoire Royal de Bruxelles
 B-Bc5: Folio number in B-Bc Litt. S. N°.5.619 Conservatoire Royal de Bruxelles
 B-Br4087: Folio number in B-Br Ms. II. 4087	Bibliothèque Royale de Bruxelles
 B-Br4089: Folio number in B-Br Ms. II. 4089	Bibliothèque Royale de Bruxelles
 Bk: Entry in Thematischer Katalog Breitkopf, Supplement IV, 1769
 BWV 1025: Entry in BWV 1025	A dur. / Trio / per il / Cembalo obligato. / con / Violino. / da. J. S. Bach.
 CZ-Bm371: Folio number in Cz-Bm Ms. Inv. 745/A.371 	Oddeleni Hudebne Historicke Moravskeho Muzea von Brno (Brünn)
 CZ-Bm372: Folio number in Cz-Bm Ms. Inv. 746/A.372	Oddeleni Hudebne Historicke Moravskeho Muzea von Brno (Brünn)
 CZ-PaRPI: Folio number in CZ-Pa ms. ŘPI504	Praha, Státní ústřední archív
 CZ-Pnm: Folio number in CZ-Pnm Ms. IV.E.36	Knibovny Národníko Musea von Prag 
 CZ-POm: Folio number in CZ-POm s. c. III	Helichovo Muzeum of Podebrady
 CZ-Pst: Folio number in CZ-Pst (Strahov Ms)	Praha, Památník národního písemnictví (Strahov)
 D-As: Folio number in D-As Ms. Tonkunst 2° fasc. III 	Stadtbibliothek von Augsburg
 D-Dl: Folio number in Ms. Mus. 2841-V-1	Dresden Weiss manuscript, Sächsische Landesbibliothek von Dresden
 D-Fschneider33: Folio number in D-Fschneider Ms. 33	Bohusch Ms, Privatbibliothek Matthias Schneider, Frankfurt
 D-Gs: Folio number in D-Gs 8° Philos. 84k	Niedersächsische Staats- und Universitätsbibliothek von Göttingen
 D-KNu: Folio number in D-KNu 5.P.177	Universitäts-und Stadtbibliothek von Köln
 D-LEmRosani: Folio number in D-LEm Ms. III.11.64	Rosani ms., Musikbibliothek der Stadt Leipzig
 D-Mbs: Folio number in D-Mbs Mus. Ms. 5362	Bayerische Staatsbibliothek von München
 D-RH879: Folio number in D-RH Ms 879 (olim: 604)	Rheda Ms., Fürst zu Bentheim-Tecklenburgische Musikbibliothek Rheda
 D-ROu52.2: Folio number in D-ROu XVII.18-52.2	Universitätsbibliothek von Rostock
 D-ROu53.1A: Folio number in D-ROu XVII.18-53.1A	Universitätsbibliothek von Rostock
 D-ROu53.1B: Folio number in D-ROu XVII.18-53.1B	Universitätsbibliothek von Rostock
 D-ROu65.6: Folio number in D-ROu XVIII-65.6a-z	Universitätsbibliothek von Rostock
 D-Witt: Folio number in D-BLfk M 184a	Wittgenstein ms. (olim Belletr. / 272, "Anleitung zum Singen"), Bad Laasphe, Fürst Wittgensteinsches Archiv Bad Laasphe
 F-PnI: Folio number in F-Pn Rés Vma ms. 1213 (olim LL 244)	"Weiss à Rome" (PthI), Bibliothèque Nationale de Paris
 F-PnII: Folio number in F-Pn Rés. Vmc ms. 61	"Venetiis / 7 7br. 1712" (PthII), Bibliothèque Nationale de Paris
 F-Sim: Folio number in F-Sim Ms. RM 271	Baltic lute book, Bibliothèque de l'Institut de Musicologie de l'Universite de Strasbourg
 GB-HA: Folio number in GB-HAdolmetsch Ms. II.B.2	The Library of Carl Dolmetsch, Haslemere
 GB-Lbl30387: Folio number in GB-Lbl Ms. Add. 30387	London Weiss ms., British Library of London
 GB-Lbl31698: Folio number in GB-Lbl Ms. Add. 31698	Straube Lute book, British Library of London
 I-VgcChilesotti: Folio number in I-BDG ms. sans cote	Chilesotti's transcription of a missing manuscript, Cini Stiftung von Venedig
 NL-DHgm50536: Folio number in NL-DHgm 50536	Den Haag Gementemuseum
 PL-Kj40633: Folio number in PL-Kj Mus. ms. 40620	Kraków, Biblioteka Jagiellońska
 PL-Wn396: Folio number in PL-Wn Rps. Muz. 396	Warszawa Biblioteka Narodowa
 PL-WRu: Folio number in PL-WRu 60019 Odds. mus.	(olim Ms. MF. 2002), Wrocław, Biblioteka Uniwersytecka
 PL-Wu2003: Folio number in PL-Wu Ms. RM 4136	(olim Ms. MF. 2003), Warszawa, Biblioteka Uniwersytecka
 PL-Wu2004: Folio number in PL-Wu Ms. RM 4137	(olim Ms. MF. 2004), Warszawa, Biblioteka Uniwersytecka
 PL-Wu2005: Folio number in PL-Wu Ms. RM 4138 (olim Ms. MF. 2005), Warszawa, Biblioteka Uniwersytecka
 PL-Wu2006: Folio number in PL-Wu Ms. RM 4139	(olim Ms. MF. 2006), Warszawa, Biblioteka Uniwersytecka
 PL-Wu2008: Folio number in PL-Wu Ms. RM 4140	(olim Ms. MF. 2008), Warszawa, Biblioteka Uniwersytecka
 PL-Wu2009: Folio number in PL-Wu Ms. RM 4141	(olim Ms. MF. 2009), Warszawa, Biblioteka Uniwersytecka
 PL-Wu2010: Folio number in PL-Wu Ms. RM 4142	(olim Ms. MF. 2010), Warszawa, Biblioteka Uniwersytecka
 PL-Wu8135: Folio number in PL-Wu Ms. RM 8135	(olim Ms. 1938.111; Inv. 8735), Warszawa, Biblioteka Uniwersytecka
 RA-BAn: Folio number in RA-BAn Ms. 236R	Biblioteca Nacional de Buenos Aires
 RF-Mcm: Folio number in RF-Mcm 282,N 8	Moskow Weiss ms., Glinka Museum Moskau
 S-SK: Folio number in S-SK Katadralsskolans Musiksamling 493 (Nr. 30)	Stifts- och landsbiblioteket, Skara
 S-Ssmf2: Folio number in S-Ssmf2	Nydahl ms
 US-NYp: Folio number in US-NYp Ms. JOG 72-29	New York Public Library

Sonatas

Sonata in F major

Sonata in D major

Sonata in G minor

Sonata in B major

Sonata in G major

Sonata in B major

Sonata in C minor

Sonata in B major

Sonata in F major

Sonata in E major

Sonata in D minor

Sonata in A major

Sonata in D minor

Sonata in G minor

Sonata in B major

Sonata in A major

Sonata in C major

Sonata in D major

Sonata in F major

Sonata in D minor

Sonata in F minor

Sonata in G major

Sonata in B major

Sonata in C major

Sonata in G minor

Sonata in D major

Sonata in C minor

Sonata in F major

Sonata in A minor

Sonata in E major

Sonata in F major

Sonata in F major

Sonata in F major

Sonata in D minor

Sonata in D minor

Sonata in D minor

Sonata in C major

Sonata in C major

Sonata in C major

Sonata in C major

Sonata in A minor

Sonata in A minor

Sonata in A minor

Sonata in A major

Sonata in A major

Sonata in A major

Sonata in A major

Sonata in F minor

Sonata in B major

Sonata in B major

Sonata in G minor

Sonata in C minor

Sonata in F major

Sonata in C major

Sonata in C minor

Sonata in B major

Sonata in B major

Sonata in D minor

Sonata in D major

Sonata in A major

Sonata in D minor

Sonata in F major

Sonata in D major

Sonata in G minor

Sonata in G major

Sonata in A major

Sonata in C minor

Sonata in F minor

Sonata in B major

Sonata in G major

Sonata in D major

Sonata in A minor

Sonata in B major

Sonata in C minor

Sonata in F major

Sonata in A minor

Sonata in B major

Sonata in C major

Sonata in C minor

Sonata in D minor

Sonata in C major

Sonata in D minor

Sonata in B major

Sonata in D minor

Sonata in A minor

Sonata in C major

Sonata in D minor

Sonata in C major

Sonata in A major

Sonata in D major

Sonata in D major

Sonata in D major

Sonata in D minor

Sonata in D minor

Sonata in G minor

Sonata in G major

Sonata in F major

Sonata in D minor

Sonata in A major

Sonata in D major

Sonata in G major

Sonata in G major

Sonata in B major

Sonata in C major

Sonata in C major

Sonata in C major

Sonata in F major

Sonata in F major

Sonata in C major

Singular pieces from London ms.

Other singular pieces

WeissSW Appendix

Other pieces

References	 
 List of works of S.L.Weiss

Weiss, Sylvius Leopold